The Gilbert–Varshamov bound for linear codes is related to the general Gilbert–Varshamov bound, which gives a lower bound on the maximal number of elements in an error-correcting code of a given block length and minimum Hamming weight over a field . This may be translated into a statement about the maximum rate of a code with given length and minimum distance. The Gilbert–Varshamov bound for linear codes asserts the existence of q-ary linear codes for any relative minimum distance less than the given bound that simultaneously have high rate. The existence proof uses the probabilistic method, and thus is not constructive.
The Gilbert–Varshamov bound is the best known in terms of relative distance for codes over alphabets of size less than 49.  For larger alphabets, Goppa codes sometimes achieve an asymptotically better rate vs. distance tradeoff than is given by the Gilbert-Varshamov bound.

Gilbert–Varshamov bound theorem

Theorem: Let . For every  and  there exists a code with rate  and relative distance 

Here  is the q-ary entropy function defined as follows:

 

The above result was proved by Edgar Gilbert for general code using the greedy method as here. For linear code, Rom Varshamov proved using the probabilistic method for the random linear code. This proof will be shown in the following part.

High-level proof:

To show the existence of the linear code that satisfies those constraints, the probabilistic method is used to construct the random linear code. Specifically the linear code is chosen randomly by choosing the random generator matrix  in which the element is chosen uniformly over the field . Also the Hamming distance of the linear code is equal to the minimum weight of the codeword. So to prove that the linear code generated by  has Hamming distance , we will show that for any  . Then by probabilistic method, there exists the linear code satisfying the theorem.

Formal proof:

We know that the linear code is defined using the generator matrix. So we use the "random generator matrix"  as a mean to describe the randomness of the linear code. So a random generator matrix  of size  contains  elements which are chosen independently and uniformly over the field .

Recall that in a linear code, the distance equals the minimum weight of the non-zero codeword. Let  be the weight of the codeword . So

By Boole's inequality, we have:

 

Now for a given message  we want to compute

Then for any message , we have: . Therefore:

 

So

Let  is a volume of Hamming ball with the radius . Then:

 

By choosing , the above inequality becomes

 

Finally , which is exponentially small in n, that is what we want before. Then by the probabilistic method, there exists a linear code  with relative distance  and rate  at least , which completes the proof.

Comments

 The Varshamov construction above is not explicit; that is, it does not specify the deterministic method to construct the linear code that satisfies the Gilbert–Varshamov bound. A naive approach is to search over all generator matrices  of size  over the field  to check if the linear code associated to  achieves the predicted Hamming distance. This exhaustive search requires exponential runtime in the worst case.
 There also exists a Las Vegas construction that takes a random linear code and checks if this code has good Hamming distance, but this construction also has an exponential runtime.
For sufficiently large non-prime q and for certain ranges of the variable δ, the Gilbert-Varshamov bound is improved by the Tsfasman-Vladut-Zink bound.

See also
 Gilbert–Varshamov bound due to Gilbert construction for the general code
 Hamming Bound
 Probabilistic method

References

 Lecture 11: Gilbert–Varshamov Bound. Coding Theory Course. Professor Atri Rudra
 Lecture 9: Bounds on the Volume of Hamming Ball. Coding Theory Course. Professor Atri Rudra
 Coding Theory Notes: Gilbert–Varshamov Bound. Venkatesan Guruswami

Coding theory